Kharv-e Olya (also Romanized as Kharv-e ‘Olyā; also known as Kharv-e Bālā, Khowr, and Khūr) is a village in Golshan Rural District, in the Central District of Tabas County, South Khorasan Province, Iran. At the 2006 census, its population was 196, in 56 families.

References 

Populated places in Tabas County